Penta-2,3-dienedioic acid (one of two chemicals called glutinic acid), is in allene-containing dicarboxylic acid. It was the first allene to be synthesized, in 1887, but the structure of it was thought to be a propyne core instead of an allene. The correct structural isomeric identity was not determined until 1954.

Literature confusion 
A diterpene, chemical name (4aR,5S,6R,8aR)-5-[(Z)-4-carboxy-3-methylbut-3-enyl]-5,6,8a-trimethyl-3,4,4a,6,7,8-hexahydronaphthalene-1-carboxylic acid, is also called glutinic acid. Some database entries for "glutinic acid" incorrectly identify it as this diterpene rather than the allene meaning in the underlying publications.

References 

Enoic acids
Dicarboxylic acids